RAN binding protein 2 (RANBP2) is protein which in humans is encoded by the RANBP2 gene. It is also known as nucleoporin 358 (Nup358) since it is a member nucleoporin family that makes up the nuclear pore complex. RanBP2 has a mass of 358 kDa.

Function 

RAN is a small GTP-binding protein of the RAS superfamily. Ran GTPase is a master regulatory switch, which among other functions, controls the shuttling of proteins between the nuclear and cytoplasm compartments of the cell. Ran GTPase controls a variety of cellular functions through its interactions with other proteins. The RanBP2 gene encodes a very large RAN-binding protein that localizes to cytoplasmic filaments emanating from the nuclear pore complex. RanBP2/Nup358 is a giant scaffold and mosaic cyclophilin-related nucleoporin implicated in controlling selective processes of the Ran-GTPase cycle. RanBP2 is composed of multiple domains. Each domain of RanBP2 selectively and directly interacts with distinct proteins such as Ran GTPase, importin-beta, exportin-1/CRM1, red opsin, subunits of the proteasome, cox11 and the kinesin-1 isoforms, KIF5B and KIF5C. Another partner of RanBP2 is  the E2 enzyme UBC9. RanBP2 strongly enhances SUMO1 transfer from UBC9 to the SUMO1 target SP100. Another target for SUMOylation is RanGAP which is the GTPase activating protein for Ran. SUMO-RanGAP interacts with a domain near the carboxyl terminus of RanBP2. These findings place sumoylation at the cytoplasmic filaments of the nuclear pore complex and suggest that, for some substrates, modification and nuclear import are linked events. The pleiotropic (multifunctional) role of RanBP2 reflects its interaction with multiple partners, each presenting distinct cellular or molecular functions. This gene is partially duplicated in a gene cluster that lies in a hot spot for recombination on human chromosome 2q.

Clinical significance 

Insufficiency of RanBP2 is directly linked to carcinogenesis, aneuploidy, and neuroprotection of photoreceptor neurons to light-elicited stress and aging. Human missense mutations in RanBP2 were identified in its leucine-rich domain and they cause autosomal dominant necrotizing encephalopathy (ADNE).

Interactions 

RANBP2 has been shown to interact with KPNB1 and UBE2I.

References

Further reading 

 
 
 
 
 
 
 
 
 
 
 
 
 
 
 
 
 
 
 
 
 
 
 
 
 
 
 
 

Nuclear pore complex